The 2013 Arkansas Razorbacks baseball team represented the University of Arkansas in baseball at the Division I level in the NCAA for the 2013 season. Dave van Horn is the coach and completed his eleventh year at his alma mater. During the season, he won his 1,000th game as a collegiate head coach.

Coaches

Source: arkansasrazorbacks.com

Schedule

|-  style="text-align:center;" bgcolor="#bbffbb"
| 1 || 2/15/13 ||  || Baum Stadium || 9–1 || Stanek (1–0) || Smith (0–1) || - || 7,712 || 1–0 || 0–0
|-  style="text-align:center;" bgcolor="#bbffbb"
| 2 || 2/16/13 || Western Illinois || Baum Stadium || 7–2 || Astin (1–0) || Willman (0–1) ||  || 7,270 || 2–0 || 0–0
|-  style="text-align:center;"  bgcolor="FFBBBB"
| 3 || 2/17/13 || Western Illinois || Baum Stadium || 5–7 || Pingel (1–0) || Daniel (0–1) || Loconsole (1) || 8,787 || 2–1 || 0–0
|-  style="text-align:center;" bgcolor="#bbffbb"
| 4 || 2/19/13 || New Orleans || Baum Stadium || 14-0 (7) || Poche (1-0) || Martinez (0-1) ||  || DH || 3–1 || 0–0
|-  style="text-align:center;" bgcolor="#bbffbb"
| 5 || 2/19/13 || New Orleans || Baum Stadium || 3–0 || Simpson (1–0) || Prest (0–1) || Beeks (1) || 6,913 || 4–1 || 0–0
|-  style="text-align:center;" bgcolor="#bbffbb"
| 6 || 2/22/13 ||  || Baum Stadium || 10–4 || Moore (1–0) || Freeland (1–1) ||  || 6,955 || 5–1 || 0–0
|-  style="text-align:center;" bgcolor="#bbffbb"
| 7 || 2/23/13 || Evansville || Baum Stadium || 5–2 || Beeks (1–0) || Isom (0–2) || Daniel (1) || 7,652 || 6–1 || 0–0
|-  style="text-align:center;" bgcolor="#bbffbb"
| 8 || 2/24/13 || Evansville || Baum Stadium || 10–2 || Killian (1–0) || Lloyd (0–1) ||  || 7,825 || 7–1 || 0–0
|-
| align=center colspan= 11 | Coca-Cola Classic, Surprise, Arizona
|-  style="text-align:center;" bgcolor="FFBBBB"
| 9 || 2/28/13 || vs.  || Surprise Stadium || 2-3 || Lilek (1-0)  || Stanek (1-1)  || Burr (1)  || 714 || 7-2  || 0-0
|-  style="text-align:center;" bgcolor="FFBBBB"
| 10 || 3/1/13 || vs.  || Surprise Stadium || 0-3 || Gonzales (2-1)  || Astin (1-1)  ||   || 427  || 7-3  || 0-0
|-  style="text-align:center;" bgcolor="FFBBBB"
| 11 || 3/2/13 || vs. Arizona State || Surprise Stadium || 1-3 || Blackford (1-0)  || Killian (1-1)  || Burr (2)  || 1,560  || 7-4  || 0-0
|-  style="text-align:center;" bgcolor="FFBBBB"
| 12 || 3/3/13 || vs.  || Surprise Stadium || 3-4 || Hamman (1-0)  || Moore (1-1)  ||  || 179  || 7-5  || 0-0
|-  style="text-align:center;" bgcolor="bbffbb"
| 13 || 3/7/13 ||  || Baum Stadium || 2-0 || Poche (2-0)  || Cederoth (1-2)  || Astin (1)  || 7,153  || 8-5  || 0-0
|-  style="text-align:center;" bgcolor="bbffbb"
| 14 || 3/8/13 || San Diego State || Baum Stadium || 4-3 || Beeks (2-0)   || Hepner (0-1) ||  || 7,502 || 9-5 || 0-0
|-  style="text-align:center;" bgcolor="#bbffbb"
| 15 || 3/9/13 || San Diego State || Baum Stadium || 8-2 || Killian (2-1) || Doran (2-2) ||  || DH || 10-5 || 0-0
|-  style="text-align:center;" bgcolor="#bbffbb"
| 16 || 3/10/13 || San Diego State || Baum Stadium || 4-1  || Gunn (1-0)  || Derby (1-1) ||  || 8,656 || 11-5 || 0-0
|-  style="text-align:center;" bgcolor="#bbffbb"
| 17 || 3/12/13 ||  || Baum Stadium || 20-2 || Altimont (1-0) || Tucker (1-2) || Simpson (1)  || 6,922  || 12-5 || 0-0
|-  style="text-align:center;" bgcolor="#bbffbb"
| 18 || 3/13/13 || Alabama A&M || Baum Stadium || 13-0 || Oliver (1-0) || Belue (0-2) ||  || 6,724  || 13-5 || 0-0
|-  style="text-align:center;" bgcolor="FFBBBB"
| 19 || 3/15/13 ||  || Baum Stadium || 1-7 || Wahl (5-0) || Killian (2-2) ||  || 8,934 || 13-6 || 0-1
|-  style="text-align:center;" bgcolor="#bbffbb"
| 20 || 3/16/13 || #8 Ole Miss || Baum Stadium || 10-1  || Fant (1-0)  || Mayers (2-1) ||  || 9,861 || 14-6  || 1-1
|-  style="text-align:center;" bgcolor="FFBBBB"
| 21 || 3/17/13 || #8 Ole Miss || Baum Stadium || 4-6 (13)  || Huber (2-0) || Moore (1-2) ||  || 7,603  || 14-7 || 1-2
|-  style="text-align:center;" bgcolor="#bbffbb"
| 22 || 3/22/13 || at #6 South Carolina || Carolina Stadium || 15-3 || Astin (2-1) || Beal (2-1) ||  || 7,616  || 15-7 || 2-2
|-  style="text-align:center;" bgcolor="#bbffbb"
| 23 || 3/23/13 || at # 6 South Carolina || Carolina Stadium || 4-2  || Stanek (2-1)  || Belcher (4-2) ||  || 7,509  || 16-7  || 3-2
|-  style="text-align:center;" bgcolor="#bbffbb"
| 24 || 3/24/13 || at #6 South Carolina || Carolina Stadium || 5-3 (11) || Killian (3-2)  || Webb (0-1) || Suggs (1) || 7,208  || 17-7 || 4-2
|-  style="text-align:center;" bgcolor="#bbffbb"
| 25 || 3/26/13 ||  || Baum Stadium || 6-0 || Poche (3-0)  || Lacy (0-3) ||  || 6,688 || 18-7 || 4-2
|-  style="text-align:center;" bgcolor="#bbffbb"
| 26 || 3/27/13 || Mississippi Valley State || Baum Stadium || 2-1 || Wright (1-0) || Killier (1-5) || Beeks (2) || 9,285  || 19-7 || 4-2
|-  style="text-align:center;" bgcolor="#bbffbb"
| 27 || 3/29/13 || #15 Mississippi State || Baum Stadium || 5-4  || Beeks (3-0) || Pollorena (4-1) || Suggs (2)  || 7,845 || 20-7 || 5-2
|-  style="text-align:center;" bgcolor="FFBBBB"
| 28 || 3/30/13 || #15 Mississippi State || Baum Stadium || 1-4  || Graveman (3-2) || Stanek (2-2) ||  || 8,742 || 20-8 || 5-3
|-  style="text-align:center;" bgcolor="#bbffbb"
| 29 || 3/31/13 || #15 Mississippi State || Baum Stadium || 3-1 || Fant (2-0) || Bracewell (0-1) || Suggs (3)  || 7,722  || 21-8 || 6-3
|-  style="text-align:center;" bgcolor="#bbffbb"
| 30 || 4/4/13 || at Alabama || Sewell-Thomas Stadium || 3-1 || Beeks (4-0)  || Sullivan (3-2) || Suggs (4) || 2,990 || 22-8 || 7-3
|-  style="text-align:center;" bgcolor="#bbffbb"
| 31 || 4/5/13 || at Alabama || Sewell-Thomas Stadium || 6-0  || Stanek (3-2) || Keller (3-4) ||  || 3,787  || 23-8 || 8-3
|-  style="text-align:center;" bgcolor="FFBBBB"
| 32 || 4/6/13 || at Alabama || Sewell-Thomas Stadium || 0-5 || Turnbull (4-1) || Fant (2-1)  ||  || 3,470 || 23-9 || 8-4
|-  style="text-align:center;" bgcolor="FFBBBB"
| 33 || 4/9/13 ||  || Baum Stadium || 0-3  || Bridges (2-1) || Wright (1-1) ||  || DH || 23-10 || 8-4
|-  style="text-align:center;" bgcolor="#bbffbb"
| 34 || 4/9/13 || New Mexico || Baum Stadium || 4-3  || Oliver (2-0) || McClain (1-1) ||  || 7,215 || 24-10 || 8-4
|-  style="text-align:center;" bgcolor="FFBBBB"
| 35 || 4/12/13 || #2 LSU || Baum Stadium || 2-6 || Nola (6-0) || Astin (2-2) ||  || 10,167 || 24-11 || 8-5
|-  style="text-align:center;" bgcolor="#bbffbb"
| 36 || 4/13/13 || #2 LSU || Baum Stadium || 8-3 || Stanek (4-2) || Eades (7-1) ||  || 10,377 || 25-11 || 9-5
|-  style="text-align:center;" bgcolor="FFBBBB"
| 37 || 4/14/13 || #2 LSU || Baum Stadium || 3-5 (10) || Cotton (2-0) || Oliver (2-1) ||  || 10,180 || 25-12  || 9-6
|-  style="text-align:center;" bgcolor="FFBBBB"
| 38 || 4/16/13 || at  || Haymarket Park || 0-3 || Kubat (1-0) || Killian (3-3) || Vogt (6) || DH || 25-13 || 9-6
|-  style="text-align:center;" bgcolor="FFBBBB"
| 39 || 4/16/13 || at Nebraska || Haymarket Park || 2-4 || Bublitz (2-0) || Oliver (2-2) || Roeder (2) || 2,563 || 25-14 || 9-6
|-  style="text-align:center;" bgcolor="FFBBBB"
| 40 || 4/19/13 ||  || Baum Stadium || 3-5 || Brashear (1-1) || Beeks (4-1)  || Jester (10) || 9,064  || 25-15 || 9-7
|-  style="text-align:center;" bgcolor="#bbffbb"
| 41 || 4/20/13 || Texas A&M || Baum Stadium || 12-2 || Stanek (5-2) || Kent (2-2) || Gunn (1) || 11,145 || 26-15 || 10-7
|-  style="text-align:center;" bgcolor="#bbffbb"
| 42 || 4/21/13 || Texas A&M || Baum Stadium || 2-1 || Fant (3-1) || Pineda (3-4) || Suggs (5) || 9,012 || 27-15 || 11-7
|-  style="text-align:center;" bgcolor="#bbffbb"
| 43 || 4/26/13 || at  || Foley Field || 2-0 || Astin (3-2) || Boling (2-6) || Suggs (6) || 2,043 || 28-15 || 12-7
|-  style="text-align:center;" bgcolor="#bbffbb"
| 44 || 4/27/13 || at Georgia || Foley Field || 2-1 ||  Beeks (5-1)|| McLaughlin (4-5) || Suggs (7) || 1,802 || 29-15 || 13-7
|- align="center" bgcolor="#bbbbbb"
|  || 4/28/13 || at Georgia || Foley Field || colspan=7|Postponed (rain)
|-  style="text-align:center;" bgcolor="#bbffbb"
| 45 || 4/30/13 ||  || Baum Stadium || 6-3 || Fant (4-1) || Hall (4-2) || Suggs (8) || 4,268 || 30-15 || 13-7
|-  style="text-align:center;" bgcolor="#bbffbb"
| 46 || 5/3/13 || at Kentucky || Cliff Hagan Stadium || 2-1 || Astin (4-2) || Reed (2-6) || Suggs (9) || 2,336 || 31-15 || 14-7
|-  style="text-align:center;" bgcolor="#bbffbb"
| 47 || 5/4/13 || at Kentucky || Cliff Hagan Stadium || 5-3 || Stanek (6-2) || Littrell (5-4) || Suggs (10) || DH || 32-15 || 15-7
|-  style="text-align:center;" bgcolor="FFBBBB"
| 48 || 5/4/13 || at Kentucky || Cliff Hagan Stadium || 3-4 || Shepherd (4-0) || Simpson (1-1)  ||  || 1,794 || 32-16  || 15-8
|-  style="text-align:center;" bgcolor="FFBBBB"
| 49 || 5/10/13 ||  || Baum Stadium || 3-8 || Godley (5-6) || Astin (4-3) ||  || 9,110 || 32-17 || 15-9
|-  style="text-align:center;" bgcolor="#bbffbb"
| 50 || 5/11/13 || Tennessee || Baum Stadium || 11-1 || Stanek (7-2) || Williams (2-4) ||  || 9,639 || 33-17 || 16-9
|-  style="text-align:center;" bgcolor="#bbffbb"
| 51 || 5/12/13 || Tennessee || Baum Stadium || 10-2 || Fant (5-1) || Quillen (2-4) ||  || 8,523 || 34-17 || 17-9
|-  style="text-align:center;" bgcolor="FFBBBB"
| 52 || 5/16/13 || at  || Plainsman Park || 0-3 || Kendrick (5-3) || Astin (4-4) || Dedrick (9) || 2,631 || 34-18 || 17-10
|-  style="text-align:center;" bgcolor="#bbffbb"
| 53 || 5/17/13 || at Auburn || Plainsman Park || 1-0 || Stanek (8-2) || O'Neal (8-4) || Suggs (11) || 3,631 || 35-18 || 18-10
|-  style="text-align:center;" bgcolor="FFBBBB"
| 54 || 5/18/13 || at Auburn || Plainsman Park || 6-11 || Cochran-Gill (1-1) || Moore (1-3) || Dedrick (10) || 2,481 || 35-19 || 18-11
|-

|-  style="text-align:center; 
| ||  ||  ||  ||  ||  ||  ||  ||  ||
|-

|-  style="text-align:center; 
| ||  ||  ||  ||  ||  ||  ||  ||  ||  || 
|-

|-  style="text-align:center; 
| ||  ||  ||  ||  ||  ||  ||  ||  ||  || 
|-

|-  style="text-align:center; 
| ||  ||  ||  ||  ||  ||  ||  ||  ||  || 
|-

February

Western Illinois

The Razorbacks began the 2013 campaign with a 9–1 victory over the Western Illinois Leathernecks at Baum Stadium. First baseman Eric Fisher, a redshirt sophomore, hit his first collegiate home run in the game, with Jacob Mahan and Brian Anderson both going 2 for 2 at the plate. The following day, the Razorbacks took a 7–2 victory over the Leathernecks with starting pitcher Barrett Astin getting the win. Matt Vinson and Joe Serrano each had 2-RBI singles. Sophomore pitcher Jalen Beeks made his first appearance for the Razorbacks in relief. Trent Daniel gave up six runs (three earned) and received the loss as Western Illinois took the third game, 7–5. The Razorbacks subsequently dropped from #1 in the Baseball America, Collegiate Baseball, and NCBWA polls.

New Orleans
Although scheduled to be a two-day series, the Razorbacks and New Orleans Privateers decided to reschedule and play a doubleheader on February 19.

Rankings

Razorbacks in the 2013 MLB Draft

References

External links
 Razorback Athletics

Arkansas Razorbacks Baseball Team, 2013
Arkansas Razorbacks baseball seasons
2013 NCAA Division I baseball tournament participants
Razor